Callilitha is a genus of moths of the family Crambidae.

Species
Callilitha boharti Munroe, 1959
Callilitha tenaruensis Munroe, 1959

References

Acentropinae
Crambidae genera
Taxa named by Eugene G. Munroe